Conway Griffith (June 1853 - April 28, 1924) was an American painter. Born in Columbus, Ohio, he moved to California, where he co-founded the art colony in Laguna Beach, California. Griffith was an aquarelle, oil and watercolor painter. He was buried in the Fairhaven Cemetery in Santa Ana.

References

1863 births
1924 deaths
People from Laguna Beach, California
American male painters
Painters from California
19th-century American painters
20th-century American painters
19th-century American male artists
20th-century American male artists